The Big Brother Awards (BBAs) recognize "the government and private sector organizations ... which have done the most to threaten personal privacy". They are named after the George Orwell character Big Brother from the novel Nineteen Eighty-Four. They are awarded yearly to authorities, companies, organizations, and persons that have been acting particularly and consistently to threaten or violate people's privacy, or disclosed people's personal data to third parties.

The awards are intended to draw public attention to privacy issues and related alarming trends in society, especially in data privacy. The contest is organized by loose coalition of  nongovernmental organizations, including Iuridicum Remedium, Privacy International, and others, although some national-level BBAs are organized by specific sponsors.

The German Big Brother Awards are organized and hosted by Digitalcourage (formerly FoeBuD) in Bielefeld.

The United States most recently hosted its Big Brother Awards – also known as the Orwell Awards or simply the Orwells – on 14 April 2005 in Seattle, Washington.  They had previously been hosted in Berkeley, California, on 12 April 2004; New York City on 3 April 2003; San Francisco, California, on 18 April 2002; and Cambridge, Massachusetts, on 7 March 2001. The first annual US Big Brother Awards were made at the Computers, Freedom and Privacy Conference in Washington, D.C., on 7 April 1999, the 50th anniversary of the publication of Orwell's Nineteen Eighty-Four. The awards were made by Simon Davies, managing director of the London-based Privacy International to recognize "the government and private sector organizations which have done the most to invade personal privacy in the United States." The awards were given in five categories: Greatest Corporate Invader, Lifetime Menace, Most Invasive Program, People's Choice, and Worst Public Official.

Countries
The following countries have their own version of the Big Brother Awards:
 Australia
 Austria
 Belgium
 Bulgaria
 Czech Republic
 Denmark
 Finland
 France
 Germany
 Hungary
 Italy
 Japan (2003)
 Netherlands
 New Zealand
 Spain
 Switzerland
 United Kingdom
 United States

See also
 Brandeis Award (privacy)
 Mass surveillance
 Orwell Award

References

External links

 International Website about the Big Brother Awards

Espionage
Global surveillance
Ironic and humorous awards
Mass surveillance
Privacy awards